Rasmus Holma (born 13 September 1992) is a Finnish professional footballer who plays for TPS, as a midfielder.

References

1992 births
Living people
Finnish footballers
Turun Toverit players
FC Inter Turku players
Åbo IFK players
Maskun Palloseura players
Turun Palloseura footballers
Veikkausliiga players
Ykkönen players
Kakkonen players
Association football midfielders
People from Kaarina
Sportspeople from Southwest Finland